Dautlarovo (Dawıtlar) is a rural locality (a village) in Kashkalevsky Selsoviet, Burayevsky District, Bashkortostan, Russia. The population was 220 as of 2010. There are 8 streets.

Geography 
Dautlarovo is located 30 km southeast of Burayevo (the district's administrative centre) by road. Kashkalevo is the nearest rural locality.

References 

Rural localities in Burayevsky District